Ptychocroca keelioides is a species of moth of the family Tortricidae. It is found in Chile (Santiago Province and Valparaíso Region).

Adults are variable, in most specimens the grey overscaling of the forewing diminishes the contrast between the dark basal area and the white or pale distal portion. They have a patch of beige-orange scaling on each side of the pouch that conceals the hindwing hair-pencil. Adults are on wing from October to February.

Etymology
The species name refers to the keel-like process of the aedeagus.

References

Moths described in 2003
Euliini
Moths of South America
Taxa named by Józef Razowski
Endemic fauna of Chile